Nicholas Kaiser (born 15 September 1954) is a British cosmologist.

Life
Kaiser received his Bachelor's in Physics at Leeds University in 1978, and his Part III in Maths at University of Cambridge in 1979. He obtained his PhD in Astronomy, also at the University of Cambridge, under the supervision of Martin Rees.

After postdoctoral positions at University of California, Berkeley, University of California, Santa Barbara, University of Sussex, and University of Cambridge, Kaiser was CITA Professor at the University of Toronto (1988–1997). In 1998 he moved to become Professor at the Institute for Astronomy of the University of Hawaii. From 2017-2022 he was Professor at École Normale Supérieure in Paris.

Kaiser was elected a Fellow of the Royal Society in 2008.

Works
Kaiser has made major contributions to cosmology:

He made the first calculation of the polarization of the cosmic microwave background (Kaiser 1983);
Explained the higher bias of cluster galaxies relative to the matter field (Kaiser 1984);
Made a detailed calculation of the statistics of density peaks in the primordial Universe (Bardeen, Kaiser, Silk & Szalay 1986);
Introduced the mathematics of redshift-space distortions (Kaiser 1987);
Computed the cosmic halo mass function using excursion set theory (Bond, Cole, Efstathiou & Kaiser 1991);
First explained the departures of galaxy cluster scaling relations from simple self-similar models (Kaiser 1991); and
Performed the first inversion of shear maps from weak gravitational lensing (Kaiser & Squires 1993).

He has written articles on details of cosmological distance measures.

Kaiser was the initiator and Principal Investigator of the PanSTARRS imaging survey of most of the sky.

Awards and honors
Kaiser has won numerous awards and honors including:

 Ontario Fellow of the Canadian Institute for Advanced Research Cosmology Program (1988)
 Helen B. Warner Prize for Astronomy of the American Astronomical Society (1989)
 NSERC Steacie Fellowship (1991–92)
 Herzberg Medal of the Canadian Association of Physicists (1993) 
 Rutherford Memorial Medal of the Royal Society of Canada (1997)
 Asteroid 16193 Nickaiser was named in his honor. The official  was published by the Minor Planet Center on 23 May 2005.
 University of Hawaii Regents Medal for Excellence in Research (2014)
 Gold Medal of the Royal Astronomical Society (2017)
 Gruber Prize in Cosmology (2019)

References 
 

1954 births
Living people
British cosmologists
Fellows of the Royal Society
Recipients of the Gold Medal of the Royal Astronomical Society